
Gmina Góra Świętej Małgorzaty is a rural gmina (administrative district) in Łęczyca County, Łódź Voivodeship, in central Poland.

Villages
Gmina Góra Świętej Małgorzaty contains the villages and settlements of Ambrożew, Bogdańczew, Bryski, Bryski-Kolonia, Czarnopole, Gaj, Głupiejew, Góra Świętej Małgorzaty, Janów, Karsznice, Konstancin, Kosin, Kosiorów, Kwiatkówek, Łętków, Maciejów, Marynki, Mętlew, Mierczyn, Moraków, Nowy Gaj, Orszewice, Podgórzyce, Rogulice, Sługi, Stary Gaj, Stawy, Tum, Witaszewice and Zagaj.

Neighbouring gminas
Gmina Góra Świętej Małgorzaty is bordered by the towns of Łęczyca and Ozorków, and by the gminas of Krzyżanów, Łęczyca, Ozorków, Piątek and Witonia.

References
 Polish official population figures 2006

Gora Swietej Malgorzaty
Łęczyca County